Tanvir Ahmed (born 3 October 1972) is a Bangladeshi cricket umpire.

Umpiring career
Tanvir Ahmed umpired his first List A match in Bangladesh in 2005–06, and his first first-class match in 2007–08. He has stood as an on-field umpire in the Bangladesh Premier League since 2012.

Ahmed has been involved in a few on-field controversial decisions in domestic matches and he has often been involved in arguments with players. In 2015 Bangladesh Premier League, in a group match Shakib Al Hasan fumed at him for his controversial decisions.

In November 2018, he was selected in the ICC International Panel of Umpires. He stood his first match as an international umpire on 17 December 2018 in the 1st T20I match between Bangladesh and West Indies.

On 22 December 2018 Ahmed was again involved in a controversial "no ball" decision in the 3rd T20I between Bangladesh and West Indies when he called a no ball resulting a protest from West Indies captain Carlos Brathwaite and team management and then fourth Umpire, match referee had to intervene into this matter to resolve it and the match was again started after a 10-minute pause.

In January 2021 he umpired in his first One Day International (ODI) match, between Bangladesh and the West Indies cricket team.

See also
 List of One Day International cricket umpires
 List of Twenty20 International cricket umpires

References

External links
 

1972 births
Living people
Bangladeshi cricket umpires
Bangladeshi One Day International cricket umpires
Bangladeshi Twenty20 International cricket umpires
People from Dhaka District